In enzymology, a succinylornithine transaminase is an enzyme that catalyzes the chemical reaction

N2-succinyl-L-ornithine + 2-oxoglutarate  N-succinyl-L-glutamate 5-semialdehyde + L-glutamate

Thus, the two substrates of this enzyme are N2-succinyl-L-ornithine and 2-oxoglutarate, whereas its two products are N-succinyl-L-glutamate 5-semialdehyde and L-glutamate.

This enzyme belongs to the family of transferases, specifically the transaminases, which transfer nitrogenous groups.  The systematic name of this enzyme class is N2-succinyl-L-ornithine:2-oxoglutarate 5-aminotransferase. Other names in common use include succinylornithine aminotransferase, N2-succinylornithine 5-aminotransferase, AstC, SOAT, and 2-N-succinyl-L-ornithine:2-oxoglutarate 5-aminotransferase.  This enzyme participates in arginine and proline metabolism.

References

 
 
 
 
 

EC 2.6.1
Enzymes of unknown structure